Community broadcasting may refer to:

Community radio
Community television